Gol Gah may refer to:
 Gol Gah, Fars
 Gol Gah, Mazandaran